"Silver Screen Shower Scene" is the first single from Felix da Housecat's album Kittenz and Thee Glitz.  Co-written with Dave Jenefsky a.k.a. The Hustler, T. Lorello a.k.a. Tommie Sunshine, and Felix himself, it features French electronic musician Miss Kittin on vocals. Miss Kittin included the Laurent Garnier remix on her DJ mix album On the Road. The song melody is sampled from "Passion" by The Flirts.

Critical reception
Resident Advisor voted "Silver Screen Shower Scene (Thin White Duke Remix)" at #71 on its Top 100 Tracks of the 2000s.

Cultural impact
"Silver Screen Shower Scene" was used in the 2005 film Kiss Kiss Bang Bang. The song was also included on the compilation album GU10. In 2003, the song was included on the compilation album As Heard on Radio Soulwax Pt. 2. In 2003 this song was included on the soundtrack of the video racing game Midnight Club 2. In 2004, the song was included on the soundtrack of the game The Getaway: Black Monday.

Cover versions
Afrika Bambaataa and Soulsonic Force covered the song for Big Day Out 04.

Track listing
 "Silver Screen Shower Scene" – 4:00 (Radio Edit)
 "Silver Screen Shower Scene (Adult. Remix)" – 4:25
 "Silver Screen Shower Scene (Thin White Duke Remix)" – 8:35

Charts

References

2001 songs
2001 debut singles
2002 singles
Felix da Housecat songs
Miss Kittin songs
Afrika Bambaataa songs